Taekwondo took place from September 30 to October 3 at the 1986 Asian Games in Sungkyunkwan University, Seoul, South Korea. Men's competitions held in eight weight categories. The host nation South Korea dominated the competition winning seven out of eight possible gold medals.

Schedule

Medalists

Medal table

Participating nations
A total of 84 athletes from 17 nations competed in taekwondo at the 1986 Asian Games:

References
 WTF Hall of Fame

External links
 Olympic Council of Asia

 
1986 Asian Games events
1986
Asian Games